Jean-Louis Lebon (born 13 June 1967) is a retired French shot putter.

He was born in Saint-Denis, Réunion. He competed at the 1996 and 1998 European Indoor Championships, but without reaching the final. He became French champion in 1994, 1995, 1996 and 1997, and French indoor champion in 1995, 1996, 1997 and 1998.

His personal best throws was 18.63 metres (indoor) achieved in 1995 and 18.57 metres achieved in 1998.

References

1967 births
Living people
Sportspeople from Saint-Denis, Réunion
Athletes from Réunion
French male shot putters
20th-century French people
21st-century French people